
Gmina Boćki  is a rural gmina (Polish:gmina wiejska) in Bielsk County, Podlaskie Voivodeship. It is located north-eastern Poland.

Geography
Gmina Boćki is located in the geographical region of Europe known as the Wysoczyzny Podlasko – Bialoruskie (English: Podlaskie and Belarus Plateau) and the mezoregion known as the Równinę Bielską (English: Bielska Plain).

The Nurzec River, a tributary of the Bug River, passes through Gmina Boćki.

Location
It is located approximately: 
  north-east of Warsaw, the capital of Poland
  south of Białystok, the capital of the Podlaskie Voivodeship
  southwest of Bielsk Podlaski, the seat of Bielsk County

Climate
The region has a continental climate which is characterized by high temperatures during summer and long and frosty winters . The average amount of rainfall during the year exceeds .

Demographics
Detailed data as of 31 December 2007:

Municipal government

Its seat is the village of Boćki

Executive branch
The chief executive of the government is the mayor (Polish: wójt).

Legislative branch
The legislative portion of the government is the Council (Polish: Rada), composed of the President (Polish: Przewodniczący), the Vice President (Polish: Wiceprzewodniczący) and thirteen councilors.

Villages
The following villages are contained within the gmina:

Andryjanki, Boćki, Bodaczki, Bodaki, Bystre, Chranibory Drugie, Chranibory Pierwsze, Dubno, Dziecinne, Hawryłki, Jakubowskie, Krasna Wieś, Młynisk, Mołoczki, Nurzec, Olszewo, Pasieka, Piotrowo-Krzywokoły, Piotrowo-Trojany, Przy Ostaszach, Sasiny, Siedlece, Siekluki, Sielc, Skalimowo, Solniki, Starowieś, Szeszyły, Szumki, Śnieżki, Torule, Wandalin, Wandalinek, Wiercień, Wojtki, Wygonowo, Wylan, Żołoćki.

Neighbouring political subdivisions
Gmina Boćki is bordered by the gminas of Bielsk Podlaski, Brańsk, Dziadkowice, Kleszczele, Milejczyce and Orla.

References 

Bocki
Bielsk County